The 2020 Generali Open Kitzbühel was a tennis tournament played on outdoor clay courts. It is the 76th edition of the Austrian Open Kitzbühel, and part of the ATP Tour 250 series of the 2020 ATP Tour. It will take place at the Tennis stadium Kitzbühel in Kitzbühel, Austria, from 6 to 13 September.

Singles main draw entrants

Seeds

 1 Rankings as of August 31, 2020.

Other entrants
The following players received wildcards into the singles main draw:
  Philipp Kohlschreiber
  Dennis Novak 
  Sebastian Ofner
  Emil Ruusuvuori
  Jannik Sinner 

The following players received entry from the qualifying draw:
  Federico Delbonis
  Laslo Đere
  Yannick Hanfmann
  Pierre-Hugues Herbert
  Marc-Andrea Hüsler
  Maximilian Marterer

Withdrawals
  Félix Auger-Aliassime → replaced by  Alexander Bublik
  Roberto Bautista Agut → replaced by  Guido Pella
  Matteo Berrettini → replaced by  Miomir Kecmanović
  Pablo Carreño Busta → replaced by  Radu Albot
  Alex de Minaur → replaced by  Feliciano López
  Taylor Fritz → replaced by  João Sousa
  Cristian Garín → replaced by  Albert Ramos Viñolas
  Andrey Rublev → replaced by  Yoshihito Nishioka
  Denis Shapovalov → replaced by  Jordan Thompson
  Dominic Thiem → replaced by  Juan Ignacio Londero
  Alexander Zverev → replaced by  John Millman

Doubles main draw entrants

Seeds 

 1 Rankings as of August 31, 2020.

Other entrants 
The following pairs received wildcards into the doubles main draw:
  Lucas Miedler /  Dennis Novak 
  Sebastian Ofner /  Jurij Rodionov

Champions

Singles

  Miomir Kecmanović def.  Yannick Hanfmann, 6–4, 6–4.

Doubles

  Austin Krajicek /  Franko Škugor def.  Marcel Granollers /  Horacio Zeballos, 7–6(7–5), 7–5.

References

External links
Official website 

Generali Open Kitzbuhel
Austrian Open Kitzbühel
Austrian Open
Generali Open Kitzbühel
Generali Open